Kabikankan Mukundaram Mahavidyalaya, is the general degree college in Keshabpur, Hooghly district. It offers undergraduate courses in arts. It is affiliated to  University of Burdwan.

Departments

Arts

Bengali(H)
English
Sanskrit
History
Political Science

See also

References

External links

Colleges affiliated to University of Burdwan
Universities and colleges in Hooghly district
Educational institutions established in 2007
2007 establishments in West Bengal